The First Presbyterian Church in Fort Scott, Kansas, at 308 S. Crawford, was built in 1925.  It was added to the National Register of Historic Places in 2008.

It is an L-shaped three-and-a-half-story brick and limestone building.  It was designed by Kansas City, Missouri architect Ernest Olaf Brostrom.  It was deemed notable as "an excellent example of Collegiate Gothic-style architecture."

References

External links

Official website

Presbyterian churches in Kansas
Churches on the National Register of Historic Places in Kansas
Gothic Revival church buildings in Kansas
Collegiate Gothic architecture
Churches completed in 1925
Buildings and structures in Bourbon County, Kansas
National Register of Historic Places in Bourbon County, Kansas